Sir Humphrey Stafford (died 1450), of Grafton in the parish of Bromsgrove, Worcestershire, was an English nobleman who served as Governor of Calais.

He was the second son and eventual heir of Sir Humphrey Stafford (1384-1419) of Grafton, a Member of the English Parliament in 1415, by his wife Elizabet Burdett. His elder brother was John Stafford (died 1422) of Grafton, whose heir he was.

He married Eleanor Aylesbury (died 1478), daughter and heiress of Thomas Aylesbury of Blatherwyke and Milton Keynes. By Eleanor he had the following known issue:
Richard Stafford
Sir Humphrey Stafford (c.1427-1486) of Grafton, son and heir, who took part in the War of the Roses on the Yorkist side and having fought for King Richard III at the Battle of Bosworth (1485), was executed by the victorious King Henry VII, following his role in the Stafford and Lovell rebellion.
Thomas Stafford
Ralph Stafford
John Stafford
Elizabeth Stafford, wife of Sir Richard Beauchamp, 2nd Baron Beauchamp.
Anne Stafford, wife of Thomas Skulle & of Sir William Berkeley
Joyce Stafford, wife of Sir Marmaduke Constable.

Stafford was killed on 7 June 1450 at Sevenoaks in Kent, during Jack Cade's Rebellion, together with his cousin William Stafford (died 1450) of Southwick, in the parish of North Bradley, Wiltshire. He was buried in the Church of St John the Baptist, Bromsgrove, where his monument survives, comprising recumbent alabaster effigies of himself and his wife, on a chest tomb.

References

Further reading
Staffords of Grafton

1450 deaths
Humphrey